St Mary's Church is a Church of England church in Little Ilford, east London. Mainly 12th century, it had its chancel rebuilt and a south porch and family chapel to the Lethieullier family added in 1724. It remained a parish church until 1938, at which point it became a chapel of ease to St Michael's Church, Romford Road. It is listed at Grade I.

References

External links

Grade I listed churches in London
Church of England church buildings in East Ham
12th-century church buildings in England
Grade I listed buildings in the London Borough of Newham